Little People is a computer-animated TV series based on the Fisher-Price toy line of the same name, produced by HIT Entertainment, and DHX Media (now known as WildBrain), and broadcast on Sprout. It premiered on Sprout on March 7, 2016. 52 episodes were produced.

It has been renewed for a second season, which started airing in 2018.

Characters

Main
Eddie (voiced by Kannon Kurowski in Season 1 and Ethan Pugiotto in Season 2) is a boy with blond hair. He wears a white T-shirt with an explosion on it, orange pants, and blue shoes.
Koby (voiced by Aden Schwartz in Season 1 and Nicolas Aqui in Season 2) is an Asian-American boy with black hair. He wears an orange T-shirt with a robot head on it, blue pants, and red-orange shoes.
Mia (voiced by Emma Shannon in Season 1 and Millie Davis in Season 2) is a Latin-American girl with brown hair. She wears a white T-shirt with a pink dress over it and pink shoes with white socks. She has a hairbow attached to her headband.
Sofie (voiced by Taylor Autumn Bertman in Season 1 and Shechinah Mpumlwana in Season 2) is a girl with red hair. She wears a teal dress, striped tights, pink shoes, and pink glasses. Her hair is styled in pigtails with blue and pink ribbons.
Tessa (voiced by Sanai Victoria in Season 1 and Chloe Bryer in Season 2) is an African-American girl with black hair. She wears a lime green T-shirt with a yellow flower on it, a purple skirt, pink leggings, and yellow shoes. Her hair is styled in buns with lime green hair elastics.

Recurring
Jack (voiced by Christopher Schleicher in Season 1 and Evan Blaylock in Season 2) is Emma's younger brother. He wears a blue T-shirt with a green pocket on it and khaki pants.
Emma (voiced by Nicole Moorea Sherman in Season 1 and Lilly Bartlam in Season 2) is Jack's older sister. She wears a purple dress with a blue flower on it, a pink headband with white polka dots, and pink shoes. 
Humpty Dumpty (voiced by Jason LaShea and Jamie Watson)
King Pigalot (voiced by Robbie Daymond)
Queen Tortoise (voiced by Dana Rosario)

Production
The show was placed into pre-production in June 2014 for a potential 2015 season premiere. The show was introduced at a Licensing Expo on June 17, 2014. The show is the first Fisher-Price brand done by newly acquired (2012) Hit. The show debuted on weekday schedule on Sprout in the United States on March 7, 2016 and on Family Jr. in Canada on March 1, 2017. Cartoon Network UK's sister preschool channel Cartoonito premiered the Little People TV series on April 11, 2016.

Episodes

Season 1 (2016-2017)
Each airs in a 15-minute block and is 11 minutes without commercial breaks.

Official number TBA:
"A Party Together is Better"

"Billy Goat Gruff"
"Clearing the Air"
"Dance To Your Own Jungle Drum"
"Different Strokes for Different Folks!" aired 12 December 2016 at 8:30am EST
"Don't Judge A Book By It's Sparkles"
"Don't Lie To Get By"
"Hurry Up and Wait" aired December 19
"Me, Myself and Eddie"
"Never Too Late To Listen"
"New Things Equals Cold Feet"
"Nuts For Sharing"
"Rumor Ruckus"
"Stash Your Trash"
"The Many Colors of Kindness" aired 12 December 2016 at 8:45am EST
"The Trouble With Bulls and Frogs"
"Two Heroes are Better Than One"
"You're The Best When You're Yourself"

Number identified:
Episode 1: "Teamwork Takes Talent!" aired 14 March 2016
Episode 2: "Imagination Cures the Blues!" aired 21 March 2016 at 3:55 PM EST
Episode 3: "Proud to Be You and Me!" aired 21 March 2016 at 4:10 PM EST
Episode 4: "Better Learn to Wait Your Turn!" aired 28 March 2016 at 3:55 PM EST
Episode 5: "The Right (and Left) Stuff" aired 28 March 2016 at 4:10 PM EST
Episode 6: "Carried Away and Back Again"
Episode 7: "Never Cheat to Beat!"
Episode 8: "Just Compare Yourself to You"
Episode 9: "Different Makes the Wool Go 'Round"
Episode 10: "A Walk in Someone Else's Hooves"
Episode 11: "One for All and All for Fun!"
Episode 12: "If I Ruled Jungleland"
Episode 13: "Sometimes Enough is Enough!" written by Samantha Hill
Episode 14: "Roar in the Face of Fright"
Episode 15: "Headed in the Right Direction"
Episode 16: "Don't Be Selfish Said the Shellfish"
Episode 17: "Party of One is No Fun!"
Episode 18: "Listening for Treasure!"
Episode 19: "Being a Big Cheese is Cheesy"
Episode 20: "A Taste of Her Own Medicine!"
Episode 21: "Nothing Wrong with Being Wrong!"
Episode 22: "Friendship" aired 11 November 2016
Episode 23: "Collecting Conclusion Clues" aired 25 November 2016
Episode 24
Episode 25
Episode 26
Episode 27
Episode 28
Episode 29
Episode 30
Episode 31
Episode 32
Episode 33
Episode 34: "May the Frost Be With You!" written by Sam Barlow aired 19 December 2016 at 5:15pm EST
Episode 35: "Acting Icey Can Be Dicey!" written by Syndi Shumer aired 19 December 2016 at 5:30pm EST
Episode 36
Episode 37
Episode 38
Episode 39
Episode 40
Episode 41: "Give it Back!" written by Syndi Shumer aired 12 December 2016 at 5:15pm EST
Episode 42
Episode 43
Episode 44
Episode 45
Episode 46
Episode 47
Episode 48
Episode 49
Episode 50
Episode 51
Episode 52

Season 2 (2018)
Each airs with the episodes divided into two-eleven minute episode segments. The Adventure Song changed and some cast voices changed.
Take Turns to Talk/Fly High and Try
Team Hero/Potty Ahoy
Don't Dawdle/As You Like It
A Space of His Own/Say So If You Don't Know
Getting to Know You/Cast Aside
Special Delivery/What Would Lucky Like?
Itching for Trouble/What's Old is New
Give a Little Listen/Trust The Jungle Bus
United We Solved/A Promise is a Promise
A New Friend For All/Braver Together
Easy Peasy/Everyone Deserves a Turn
Snail Mail/Rainy Day Delay
Sofie's Photo No-No/A Time and a Place
Nothing to Sneeze At/Koby Speaks Up
Messy Mia/The Tessa Show
The Princess and the Parade/Radical Rainbow Road Race
Cookie Caper/Just My Luck
Koby's Penguin Posse/Mia the Magnificent
Awesomely Amazing Picnic Adventure/The Big Beautiful Butter Beast
Beginners are Winners/Emma by the Book
Jack of the Jungle/Eddie and the Yeti
Firehouse Four/A Place for Friendly Friends
Delivering Happiness/Castaway Capers
The Lepo-Potamus/Treasure Beyond Measure
Listen Up/Worth the Wait

Home media
In 2018, Universal Pictures Home Entertainment signed a deal with DHX Media and Mattel Creations to purchase the North American DVD rights to Little People. In Italy, Eagle Pictures will release the series soon on DVD. In Germany, Just Bridge Entertainment released the series on DVD. In UK, Abbey Home Media Group released the series on DVD.

References

External links

2010s American animated television series
2010s American children's television series
2010s British animated television series
2010s British children's television series
2010s Canadian animated television series
2010s Canadian children's television series
2016 American television series debuts
2016 British television series debuts
2016 Canadian television series debuts
2018 American television series endings
2018 British television series endings
2018 Canadian television series endings
American children's animated adventure television series
American children's animated comedy television series
American children's animated fantasy television series
American children's animated musical television series
American computer-animated television series
American preschool education television series
English-language television shows
British computer-animated television series
British children's animated adventure television series
British children's animated comedy television series
British children's animated fantasy television series
British children's animated musical television series
British preschool education television series
Canadian children's animated adventure television series
Canadian children's animated comedy television series
Canadian children's animated fantasy television series
Canadian children's animated musical television series
Canadian computer-animated television series
Canadian preschool education television series
Animated preschool education television series
2010s preschool education television series
Treehouse TV original programming
Family Jr. original programming
Animated television series about children
Television series by DHX Media
Television series by Mattel Creations
Television shows based on Mattel toys